Deconica pegleriana is a species of mushroom in the family Strophariaceae. It can be found in Mexico, Thailand, India, Papua New Guinea, the Southeastern United States and South America.

References

Strophariaceae
Fungi described in 2000
Fungi of North America
Fungi of South America
Fungi of Asia
Taxa named by Rolf Singer
Fungi of New Guinea